The Swing Sisters are a trio of female Danish singers who perform hit songs of the 1940s and earlier. The trio often pay tribute to The Andrews Sisters, as well as many others, such as The Boswell Sisters. They have collaborated with the Pasadena Roof Orchestra on several occasions. The group has a strong following in Denmark, Sweden, Germany and England.

Brief history
The Swing Sisters originally was formed to take part in the musical Swing Sisters in Denmark in the autumn of 1992. The trio consists of:
 Kirsten Siggaard - one of Denmark's most famous singers (she has represented her country in the Eurovision Song Contest on no less than three occasions);
 Kirsten Vaupel - originally an opera singer and nowadays working as coach; and
 Lise Lotte Norup - a Danish actress, singer  and television star.

Discography
Take Me Back (MCI, 1993)
Sentimental Journey (MCI, 1994)
Dagen Vi Aldrig Glemmer (1995)
Swingin' X-mas (1997)
Let It Be Swing (2003)

See also
 The Temperance Seven
 The Pasadena Roof Orchestra

Danish musical groups
Musical groups established in 1992